“The Happiest I’ve Been” is a work of short fiction by John Updike, first appearing in The New Yorker on January 3, 1959. The story was collected in The Same Door (1959) published by Alfred A. Knopf.

Plot

The narrator, John Nordholm, a 19-year-old college sophomore, has returned to his childhood home in Olinger (a fictional rural town in Pennsylvania) for Christmas vacation. John and his former high school classmate Neil Hovey arrange to drive to Chicago to visit girlfriends for New Year's Eve. John bids farewell to his parents. Rather than proceeding directly on their journey, the youths decide to first attend a local party that evening in Olinger that involves a measure of alcohol consumption, dancing and carousing.

The lively gathering of John's high school friends continues late into the night and the boys pair off with two of the local girls, Margaret Lento and a girlfriend (unnamed). In the wee hours of the morning the boys deliver the girls to Margaret's home in a nearby town. Margaret invites the group in to have coffee. Neil and Margaret's friend neck in the darkened house. John and Margaret chat, sharing experiences they've had with the people they've grown up with. After a tender kiss, she falls asleep in his arms.

At sunrise the youths depart together for Chicago, taking turns sleeping and driving on the anticipated 17-hour trip. John is filled with a tremendous sense of optimism, anticipation and pride as he embarks upon his adulthood.

Theme
The “bittersweet” events Updike describes in “The Happiest I’ve Been” concern the final hours of his boyhood and his first awareness of himself as an adult. Biographer Adam Begley notes the author's willingness “to indulge liberally in nostalgia, to replay the past, frame by frame, and wring every last drop out of reminiscence—a technique Updike had mastered as early as 1958 in “The Happiest I’ve Been.” Detweiler, 1984 p. 18: “The nostalgia for an irretrievable carefree past is balanced by a pride in the assumed responsibility of adult relationships.”</ref>

Detweiler identifies those moments that comprise the happiest of the narrator's life in the expressions of trust he has elicited from others: “There was knowing that twice since midnight a person had trusted me enough to fall asleep beside me.” Detwieler writes:

Literary critic William H. Pritchard considers the final passages from “The Happiest I’ve Been” among “the best pieces of writing to be found anywhere in Updike.” Pritchard quotes Updike's own appraisal of the story: “I had a sensation of breaking through, as if through a thin sheet of restraining glass, to material, to truth, previously locked up.”

Literary critic Robert M. Luscher the moment of narrator's transition to adulthood:

Footnotes

Sources 
Begley, Adam. 2014. Updike. Harpercollins Publishers, New York. 
Carduff, Christopher. 2013. Ref. 1  Note on the Texts in John Updike: Collected Early Stories. Christopher Carduff, editor. The Library of America. pp. 910–924 
Detweiler, Robert. 1984. John Updike. Twayne Publishers, G. K. Hall & Co., Boston, Massachusetts.  (Paperback).
Luscher, Robert M. 1993. John Updike: A Study of the Short Fiction. Twayne Publishers, New York. 
Pritchard, Richard H.. 2000. Updike: America’s Man of Letters. Steerforth Press, Southroyalton, Vermont.
Searles, George J. 1982. The Poorhouse Fair: Updike’s Thesis Statement in Critical Essays on John Updike. G. K. Hall & Co. (1982), [William R. Macnaughton, editor. pp. 231–236. 

1959 short stories
Short stories by John Updike
Works originally published in The New Yorker